Joseph Aimé Roger Parizeau (29 May 1920 – 20 May 1968) was a Progressive Conservative party member of the House of Commons of Canada. He was born in Montreal, Quebec and became a salesman by career.

Parizeau first attempted to win the Lac-Saint-Jean riding in the 1957 federal election but lost to André Gauthier of the Liberal Party who held that riding since 1949. Parizeau won the seat from Gauthier in the following year's election and served one term, the 24th Canadian Parliament, before his defeat in the 1962 election by Marcel Lessard of the Liberals.

External links
 
 

1920 births
1968 deaths
Members of the House of Commons of Canada from Quebec
People from Alma, Quebec
Politicians from Montreal
Progressive Conservative Party of Canada MPs